Matthew Coward-Holley (born 14 December 1994) is a British sport shooter.

Coward-Holley was a promising rugby player as a teenager but two serious back injuries involving broken vertebrae ended his playing. In order to remain active, he turned to shooting, a sport he had done with his father between the ages of 8 and 12 before taking up rugby.

He participated at the 2019 World Shotgun Championships, where he became the first Briton to win a world title in an individual Olympic shotgun discipline. He went on to win two medals at the 2021 European Shooting Championships, including trap gold.

He qualified to represent Great Britain at the 2020 Summer Olympics, securing bronze in the men’s trap.

References

External links

Living people
1994 births
British male sport shooters
Trap and double trap shooters
Sportspeople from Chelmsford
European Games competitors for Great Britain
Shooters at the 2019 European Games
Shooters at the 2020 Summer Olympics
Medalists at the 2020 Summer Olympics
Olympic medalists in shooting
Olympic bronze medallists for Great Britain
20th-century British people
21st-century British people